Hyrum Tipene Harris (born 3 June 1996) is a New Zealand professional basketball player for the Adelaide 36ers of the Australian National Basketball League (NBL).

Early life 
Harris was born in Auckland and raised in Hamilton, New Zealand.

Professional career

NZNBL (2015–2019) 
After playing for the Super City Rangers during the 2015 New Zealand NBL season, Harris relocated to the United States to play college basketball for the Umpqua Community College in Oregon during the 2015–16 season. He played for the Rangers in 2016 and 2017 before joining the Hawke's Bay Hawks in 2018. In 2019, Harris played for the Southland Sharks, where he averaged 11 points, 6.4 rebounds and 3.7 assists on an average of 26 minutes a game across 19 games that season.

Illawarra Hawks (2019–2020) 
In September 2019, Harris joined the Illawarra Hawks of the Australian National Basketball League (NBL) as a development player. Across 16 games, Harris averaged 2.6 points and 1.4 rebounds across an average of 6.7 minutes per game, with a high of eight points and five rebounds against the Adelaide 36ers.

Manawatu Jets (2020) 
After not being pre-selected for the NZNBL draft for the 2020 season, Harris was drafted by the Manawatu Jets. Despite missing a few games with injury, he finished the season leading the league with 2.7 steals per game, second in the league with 11.6 rebounds and 6.4 assists per game, whilst also averaging 15.1 points across 30.8 minutes per game.

Cairns Taipans (2021) 
On 2 April 2021, Harris signed with the Cairns Taipans of the Australian NBL as an injury replacement player. He made just the one appearance for the Taipans during the 2020–21 NBL season.

Hawke's Bay Hawks and Adelaide 36ers (2021–present) 
Harris returned to the Hawke's Bay Hawks for the 2021 NZNBL season, scoring 18 points in the season opener against the Canterbury Rams on 2 May.

On 3 November 2021, Harris signed with the Adelaide 36ers for the 2021–22 NBL season. He was named the 36ers' Club Most Improved Player.

On 30 March 2022, Harris re-signed with the Hawks for the 2022 NZNBL season.

On 3 May 2022, Harris re-signed with the 36ers for the 2022–23 NBL season.

On 31 January 2023, Harris re-signed with the Hawks for the 2023 NZNBL season.

Personal life 
Harris is the son of Allies Evans and Reuben Harris.

References

External links 
 NBL player profile

1996 births
Living people
Adelaide 36ers players
Basketball players from Auckland
Cairns Taipans players
Hawke's Bay Hawks players
Illawarra Hawks players
Manawatu Jets players
New Zealand men's basketball players
Small forwards
Southland Sharks players
Super City Rangers players